Alorese is an Austronesian language spoken on Alor and the neighboring islands of the Alor archipelago in eastern Indonesia. It is not to be confused with non-Austronesian (Papuan) languages of the Alor–Pantar family which are also spoken in this region. It is also distinct from Alor Malay, a Malay variety which is currently supplanting Alorese as the language of wider communication in the region.  Alorese is the native language of several immigrant communities located along the coast of the Alor archipelago, especially at Alor Kecil on Alor and at Baranusa and Marica on Pantar. It has also been used extensively as a trade language in the region.

Alorese is closely related to Lamaholot and is often classified as a dialect thereof. Researchers like Klamer (2011), who found that Alorese shares only half its basic vocabulary with Lamaholot, consider Alorese to be distinct enough to be considered its own language.

References

Notes

Sources 

 
 

Flores-Lembata languages
Languages of Indonesia